The Irish in Us is a 1935 American comedy film directed by Lloyd Bacon and starring James Cagney, Pat O'Brien, and Olivia de Havilland. Written by Earl Baldwin based on a story by Frank Orsatti, the film is about an Irish family consisting of a mother and three sons: a cop, a fireman, and a boxing promoter. Encouraged to find a real job, the boxing promoter makes one last attempt by promoting a fighter he believes will bring him a fortune. The Irish in Us was released in the United States by Warner Bros. Pictures on August 3, 1935. The supporting cast features Frank McHugh and J. Farrell MacDonald.

Plot

In Manhattan's lower east side, police officer Pat O'Hara (Pat O'Brien) wants his boxing promoter brother Danny (James Cagney) to acquire a more dependable job in order to support their mother after Pat marries his girlfriend Lucille Jackson (Olivia de Havilland).  When Lucille meets charismatic Danny, she promptly falls for him- which complicates matters, to say the least.

When his fighter Hammerschlog (Allen Jenkins) gets cold feet just before a packed house charity boxing match, Danny has no choice but to step into the ring himself. Danny wins a bruising multi-round battle, and the publicity from the fight would seem to assure his future success as a promoter.

Cast

Box Office
According to Warner Bros records the film earned $894,000 domestically and $443,000 foreign.

References

External links

 
 
 
 
 

1935 films
1930s sports comedy films
American sports comedy films
American black-and-white films
American boxing films
1930s English-language films
Films about Irish-American culture
Films directed by Lloyd Bacon
Films set in New York City
First National Pictures films
Warner Bros. films
Films produced by Samuel Bischoff
1935 comedy films
1930s American films